Kirha is a village located in the Chümoukedima District of Nagaland and is a suburb of Chümoukedima, the district headquarters.

History
Kirha was founded by members of Kirhazou-mi Clan from Viswema in Kohima District.

Demographics
Kirha is situated in Chümoukedima District of Nagaland. As per the Population Census 2011, there are total 168 families residing in Kirha. The total population of Kirha is 707.

See also
Chümoukedima District

References

Villages in Chümoukedima district